William Freeman Gilbreth (September 3, 1947 – July 12, 2020) was an American professional baseball player who played three seasons for the Detroit Tigers and California Angels of Major League Baseball. He died on July 12, 2020, from complications of heart surgery.

References

External links

1947 births
2020 deaths
Major League Baseball pitchers
Abilene Christian Wildcats baseball coaches
Abilene Christian Wildcats baseball players
Detroit Tigers players
California Angels players
Baseball players from Texas
Sportspeople from Abilene, Texas
Montgomery Rebels players
Rocky Mount Leafs players
Salt Lake City Angels players
Toledo Mud Hens players